Algimantas Sakalauskas (September 22, 1958) is a Lithuanian folk artist and wood sculptor.

Born near Vilkaviškis, after high school graduation Sakalauskas moved to Prienai, where he lives and works now. He has created a lot of sculptures, children playgrounds and monuments in Lithuania and other countries. He creates open-air monuments  in height. Currently, Sakalauskas is the director of "Meninė drožyba" in Prienai.

Sakalauskas is a certified cross maker and A category craft artist. In 2001, he was awarded the Prize of the Lithuanian Ministry of Culture for ethnocultural work. Sakalauskas participated in internationals wood carvers symposiums and exhibitions in Lithuania Poland, Czech Republic, Austria, Germany, Japan.

Books by Sakalauskas
 Sūduvos krašto drožyba, skulptūra, kryždirbystė (Suduva region carving, sculpture cross-making, 2006) 
 Medžio dirbiniai sodyboje (Wood works for homestead, 2009)

References

External links 
 Algimantas Sakalauskas official website
 Meninė drožyba official website

1958 births
Living people
People from Vilkaviškis District Municipality
Lithuanian sculptors